Ganges Wood is a woodland in Suffolk, England, near the village of Shotley Gate. It is owned and managed by the Woodland Trust.

References

Forests and woodlands of Suffolk
Shotley